Idriss Mzaouiyani (born 15 January 2000) is a French professional footballer who plays as a midfielder for Al-Fujairah.

Career statistics

References

2000 births
Living people
French footballers
French expatriate footballers
Association football midfielders
Championnat National 2 players
UAE Pro League players
UAE First Division League players
Al Ain FC players
Al Dhafra FC players
Fujairah FC players
Expatriate footballers in the United Arab Emirates
French expatriate sportspeople in the United Arab Emirates